A list of films produced in the Soviet Union in 1969 (see 1969 in film).

1969

External links
 Soviet films of 1969 at the Internet Movie Database

1969
Soviet
Films